The National Tourism Agency (AKT) is a government agency under the supervision of the Albanian Ministry of Tourism and Environment. The main task of the agency is to promote Albania as a tourist destination in the Mediterranean Basin, Europe and around the world. AKT organizes and manages the country's participation in international tourist fairs and provides on-line promotional offers to various international tour operators.

References

 
Tourism